The long-tailed pygmy possum (Cercartetus caudatus) is a diprotodont marsupial found in the rainforests of northern Australia and New Guinea. Living at altitudes of above , it eats insects and nectar, and may eat pollen in place of insects in the wild.

It is known as sumsum in the Kalam language of Papua New Guinea.

Description
The long-tailed pygmy possum has large eyes, mouse/rodent-like ears, a pouch that opens anteriorly, and a tail that is about one and a half times as long as the body, giving the possum its name.

Behavior
Not much is known of this possum's behaviour, but what is known is that this species is both nocturnal and arboreal. In cold weather, it becomes torpid and looks and feels dead, but wakes at night. Not much is known on the origin of this torpor.

Life cycle
This species breeds twice a year. Females have one to four young born around January and February and sometimes a second litter from late August to early September. The young leave the nest when they are 45 days old.

References

Possums
Marsupials of Australia
Mammals of Queensland
Marsupials of New Guinea
Mammals of Papua New Guinea
Mammals of Western New Guinea
Mammals described in 1877
Taxa named by Henri Milne-Edwards